Hartley's is a brand of marmalades, jams and jellies, originally from the United Kingdom, which is manufactured at Histon, Cambridgeshire. The brand was formerly owned by Premier Foods, until it was sold along with the factory in Histon to Hain Celestial for £200 million in October 2012. Hartley's operates as a brand of Hain Celestial's subsidiary of the United Kingdom, Hain Daniels.

History 
Hartley's was a grocers founded by Sir William Pickles Hartley in Colne in the now borough of Pendle. near Pendle, Lancashire. In 1871, a supplier failed to deliver a consignment of jam, so William made his own and packaged it in his own design earthenware pots. It sold well, and in 1874, the business moved to Bootle, near Liverpool, and marmalade and jelly was also produced. 

In 1884, the business was incorporated as William Hartley & Sons Limited and in 1886, it moved to Aintree, Liverpool where a new factory was built. A second factory in Bermondsey, South London opened in 1901, supplied with pots and jars in its early decades from a facility in Rutherglen, Scotland acquired in 1898. With production having moved to Cambridgeshire in the 1960s, the Bermondsey factory was later converted into luxury apartments in 2003. In 2020, Hartley's No Added Sugar Apple Jelly Pot won the Lausanne Index Prize - Bronze Award.

Hartley Village
Two years after the new factory had been opened in Aintree, Hartley constructed a purpose built village for the key employees in his company. 

The village was designed by Leek based father and son architects William Sugden and William Larner Sugden after they had won an architectural competition. The village had a total of forty nine houses, which surrounded a central bowling green, and later expansion took the total number of houses to seventy one. Within the village, all of the streets were named after ingredients in jam, including Sugar Street, Red Currant Court and Cherry Row. 

It was made a conservation area in 2011 and has been compared to the larger and better known nearby development of Port Sunlight on The Wirral.

Varieties 

Best apricot jam
Best black cherry jam
Best blackberry jam
Best blueberry jam
Best gooseberry jam
Best pineapple jam
Best raspberry jam
Best strawberry jam
Best thin cut marmalade
Best lemon curd

References

External links
 
 Hartley's Village Heritage Council

Food manufacturers of the United Kingdom
Premier Foods brands
Marmalade
Companies based in Liverpool